Marco Kruger (born 20 August 1992 in Nelspruit, South Africa) is a South African rugby union player, who most recently played for the . His regular position is lock or loose forward.

Career

Youth and Varsity Rugby

Kruger is originally from Malelane and completed his schooling at Nelspruit Hoërskool.

He also played for the UP Tuks Blue Bulls Academy as well as for Tuks Under-20 and Under-21, winning the Carlton League in Pretoria.

Pumas

He was an unused member of the Pumas 2015 Vodacom Cup squad that won the competition for the first time in their history, beating  24–7 in the final.

He was then named in the Pumas squad for the 2015 Currie Cup Premier Division.

References

South African rugby union players
Living people
1992 births
People from Mbombela
Rugby union locks
Rugby union flankers
Pumas (Currie Cup) players
Griffons (rugby union) players
Rugby union players from Mpumalanga